Marcel Cousineau (born April 30, 1973) is a Canadian former professional ice hockey player who played 26 games in the National Hockey League with the Toronto Maple Leafs, New York Islanders, and Los Angeles Kings between 1996 and 2000.

Playing career
Cousineau was selected by the Boston Bruins in the third round of the 1991 NHL Entry Draft. 

As a rookie, Cousineau was named to the Quebec Major Junior Hockey League All-Rookie Team. 

Cousineau played professionally for the Toronto Maple Leafs (1996–98), New York Islanders (1998–99), Los Angeles Kings (1999–2000). 

Between his starts in the NHL, Cousineau played in the American Hockey League, International Hockey League, Quebec Senior Hockey League, Ligue Nord-Américaine de Hockey) and the Kontinental Hockey League.

Career statistics

Regular season and playoffs

External links
 

1973 births
Living people
Beauport Harfangs players
Boston Bruins draft picks
Canadian expatriate ice hockey players in Russia
Canadian ice hockey goaltenders
Drummondville Voltigeurs players
Ice hockey people from Quebec
Los Angeles Kings players
Long Beach Ice Dogs (IHL) players
Lowell Lock Monsters players
Manchester Monarchs (AHL) players
New York Islanders players
People from Montérégie
Severstal Cherepovets players
Toronto Maple Leafs players